Listening Snow Tower   is a 2019 Chinese television series starring Qin Junjie and Yuan Bingyan, based on the novel of the same name by Cang Yue. It aired on Tencent Video on May 6, 2019.

Synopsis 
The story follows Xiao Yiqing (Qin Junjie), the master of the Listening Snow Tower and Shu Jingrong (Yuan Bingyan), daughter of the Blood Demon. In jianghu, Moon Sect strikes as a terrifying force and its poisonous influence grew under the command of Hua Lian (Jessica Hsuan), sect leader of Moon Sect. Bai Di (He Zhonghua), Xue Gu (Wang Jiusheng) and 'Blood Demon' Shu Xuewei (Lu Fangsheng), three powerful martial artist in wulin, join forces with the master of Listening Snow Tower to rid evil and bring back peace. Hua Lian, however, possesses a formidable weapon; allowing her to control the Blood Demon, who ends up killing himself to protect his beloved daughter: Shu Jingrong.

Orphaned with nowhere to go, young Shu Jingrong meets young master of Listening Snow Tower, Xiao Yiqing, whom she wholeheartedly remembers for his care and kindness towards her. Shu Jingrong then goes under the tutelage of Bai Di, earning her a new name Qingming and lives with him and his disciples Qinglan (Han Chengyu) and Qingyu (Zhao Dongze) in Bottomless Sand Valley.

Under the pressure of the looming Moon Sect and their treacherous plots, Shu Jingrong learns of her accursed fate of afflicting those she loves. She sets out to reawaken her father's weapon: Blood Rose Sword, uniting with Xiao Yiqing to fight the wicked and put an end Moon Sect, bringing peace and balance to the world.

Cast

Main 

 Qin Junjie as Xiao Yiqing 
 Son of Xiao Shishui and Xue Wen. Young master of the Snow tower, later become master of the tower. He suffers from the sickness of Jue Yin disease for his whole life. Lost his mom at a young age, but finds out later that she is alive. His dad was killed by Hua Lian. He wants to get revenge for his parents and everyone from the Sand Valley and all the other people involve in the Moon sect. He cares a lot about Shu Jingrong.
 Yuan Bingyan as Shu Jingrong  / Qing Ming
 Daughter of the Blood Demon. She lost her dad and mom because of the Moon Sect's leader, Hua Lian. She was Bai Di's junior disciple with her senior brothers, Qing Lan and Qing Yu. She cares a lot about Qing Lan. 3 years later, she joined the Snow Tower and worked with Xiao Yiqing to get revenge. Later the two fall in love and undergoing life and death.
 Han Chengyu as Qing Lan / Jia Ruo
 He was Bai Di's senior disciple until the Moon sect attacked the Sand Valley and killed his master. He cares a lot about Shu Jingrong a.k.a. Qing Ming who normally calls her "Ming'er". He was almost killed but was saved by Ming He who is the young leader of the Moon Sect. He lost his memories after the incident of the Sand Valley and went with the name Jia Ruo. He became the High Priest of the Moon Sect.
 Angela Yuen as Ming He 
 Hua Lian and Ming Che's daughter, young leader of the Moon sect later becomes the leader of the sect. She saves Qing Lan after the attack at the Sand Valley, but he loses his memory b/c of Ming He. Ming He will do anything to keep the past in the past and make Jia Ruo hers. She loves him and will do anything to prevent him from remembering the past.
 Lin Yuan as Chi Xiaotai 
 She is a Snow tower Disciple, Chi Xue Gu's daughter, Nan Chu and Xiao Yiqing's junior sister. Secretly cares about Xiao YiQing without knowing that Gao Mengfei cares a lot about her. She caused a lot of trouble and made huge mistakes that no one knew until later on. She then later rebels with Gao Meng Fei b/c they are jealous of not having the spotlight shining on them.
 Zhao Dongze as Qing Yu / Gao Mengfei
 He was Bai Di's second disciple until the Moon sect attacked the Sand Valley and killed his master. After that, he was ambushed, almost dying and changed his name to Gao Mengfei, and went separate with Shu Jingrong letting her wandering around Jianghu. He joined the Snow Tower. He falls for Chi Xiaotai. He rebels from the Snow Tower with Xiatai because he was jealous, attempting to take the throne of Snow Tower from Xiao Yiqing by killing him and desire power and glory.
 Zhang Tianyang as Nan Chu 
 He is a Lord of the Snow tower, Chi Xue Gu's senior disciple, Xiao Yiqing and Chi Xiaotai's senior brother. He is always there for Xiao Yiqing. He was poisoned by Ming He's blood worms and later killed himself so he wouldn't harm Xiao Yiqing.
 Bai Shu as Huang Quan 
 Formerly a member of the Tian Li Assembly and later recruited by Xiao Yiqing. One of the guardians of the Snow Tower. Very Loyal. Falls in love with Zi Mo.
 Li Ruojia as Zi Mo  
 Recruited by Xiao Yiqing. One of the guardians of the Snow Tower. Very Loyal. Falls in love with Huang Quan.
 Guo Ji as Bi Luo 
 Recruited by Xiao Yiqing. One of the guardians of the Snow Tower. Very Loyal. He is very good with the Zither and sword fighting. Cares about Hong Chen.
 Zhang Yang as Hong Chen 
 Recruited by Xiao Yiqing. One of the guardians of the Snow Tower. Very Loyal. Cares about Bi Luo.

Supporters 

 Jessica Hsuan as Hua Lian
 Fu Chengpeng as Xiao Shishui
 Lu Fangsheng as Shu Xiewei
 Yang Mingna as Xue Wen
 He Zhonghua as Bai Di
 Li Ze as Gu Guang
 Xi Xue as Yin Liuzhu
 Zhao Ruihan as Bing Ling
 Fu Mengni as Xie Bingyu / Jiang Qianmei
 Zheng Xiaoning as Lei Zhentian
 Lu Peng as Lei Chuyun / Qiu Huyu
 Li Tai as Nangong WuGou
 Cao Yuchen as Qing Ya / Hao Tian
 Feng Lijun as Ren Feiyang
 Huang Xinyao as Xue Qingming
 Huang Sihan as Xiao Ling 
 Xiong Taijun as Su Wu
 Wang Jiusheng as Chi Xue Gu
 Cheng Cheng as Qing Hui
 Lu Xingyu as Mai Qiancheng
 Xie Ning as Xie Lizhou
 Wu Jingyi as Ye Fengsha
 Dong Hui as Shi Mingyan

Production
The drama began filming at Hengdian World Studios on January 28, 2018. It wrapped up filming on July 31, 2018.

Reception
The drama received mainly negative reviews. It was criticized for ambiguous world setting, lack of clarity and coherence in plot, weak sub-plot, dull characters, and loopholes in plot. Additionally, it was criticized by novel fans for changing the entire plot of the novel. The heroine, Shu Jingrong, was originally a powerful and strong character in the novel but was changed to a weak character in the drama.

Soundtrack

International broadcast
 In Sri Lanka, the drama is available to stream on-demand via Iflix with subtitles and is billed under the name, "Snow Tower".

References 

2019 Chinese television series debuts
2019 Chinese television series endings
Tencent original programming
Chinese web series
Chinese wuxia television series
Television series by H&R Century Pictures
Television shows based on Chinese novels